HMS Brigham was one of 93 ships of the  of inshore minesweepers.

Their names were all chosen from villages ending in -ham. The minesweeper was named after Brigham in Cumbria.

The ship's bell is now in St Bridget's Church of England Primary School, Brigham, where it was used as a fire alarm until a more modern fire alarm system was installed.

Brigham was sold to Australian interests in 1968 and renamed MV Brigham. Refitted in Southampton as a prospective ferry she sailed with a crew of ten (via Las Palmas, Monrovia, Cape Town, Durban, Mauritius, and Albany) to Port Lincoln, South Australia, arriving on 24 December 1969 after a 16-week voyage, including a lengthy stop in Cape Town.

Sold in 1970 to the Australian company Southern Concrete, and taken to Adelaide for a full refit.
Whilst in Adelaide the company experienced financial difficulties and the vessel had the distinction of being the first vessel in many decades to have a warrant pinned to her mast for non-payment of harbour dues.

Sold to NT fishing company sometime after and last heard of in the late 1970s being used as a prawn trawler in the Gulf of Carpentaria.

References

Blackman, R. V. B. ed. Jane's Fighting Ships (1953)

 

Ham-class minesweepers
Royal Navy ship names
1953 ships